tRNA (guanine-N(7)-)-methyltransferase is an enzyme that in humans is encoded by the METTL1 gene.

This gene is similar in sequence to the S. cerevisiae YDL201w gene. The gene product contains a conserved S-adenosylmethionine-binding motif and is inactivated by phosphorylation. Alternative splice variants encoding different protein isoforms and transcript variants utilizing alternative polyA sites have been described in the literature.

See also
7-Methylguanosine

References

Further reading